Energise Records is a British independent record label established in 1993.

The label specialises in uptempo dance covers and compilations of HI-NRG/POP based releases.

The label has released records for artists such as Sean Smith, Nicki French, Peter Wilson, Hazell Dean, Jane Badler, Rozalla, Linda Martin, Paul Varney, Haywoode, Spray, Sonia and Sinitta.

Background
Included in the list of artists signed is Hazell Dean who signed with the label in 2014.

Work with artists
Energise records had a desire to record a dance version of the Bonnie Tyler hit "Total Eclipse of the Heart". They decided not to go with the female singer they had in mind, and approached John Springate. He phoned Nicki French with whom he had worked in the past, and asked her if she wanted to give it a go. Thinking of it as a classic track she was reluctant to play around with it. After hearing a sample of the backing track over the phone, she decided to try recording it, and did so in 1993. The intention was to just sell the promo around pubs, clubs and at gigs. They later met with Mike Stock and Matt Aitken. French's vocal was re-recorded and the track was released in 1994. It reached the lower end of the charts. A remix was re-released in early 1995. It went to no 12 in the UK charts straight away and climbed from there. Later in the US, around June, it reached no. 2 in the pop chart.

Recorded releases
Following his signing to Energise Records, Sean Smith had his third single released around September 2017, "Fire", which was written b  Charlie Mason and Daniel Volpe. It was released as an EP with remixes by Ricardo Autobahn and FNK’D UP.

Catalogue (selective)

12" T series

See also
 List of record labels

References

British independent record labels
Record labels established in 1993
Pop record labels
Electronic dance music record labels